Poliaenus volitans is a species of beetle in the family Cerambycidae. It was described by John Lawrence LeConte in 1873. It is known from Guatemala and Mexico.

References

Pogonocherini
Beetles described in 1873